Kay O'Neill (also known as K. O'Neill, and who has published under the name Katie O'Neill) is an illustrator and writer from New Zealand.

Biography
O'Neill is a self-taught artist who has produced several comics and graphic novels. They initially built a fan base by publishing comics on their Tumblr page, such as Princess Princess, which was later published as a book by Oni Press as Princess Princess Ever After. O'Neill notes "a different kind of accessibility and visibility that comes with a book, particularly one that is in easy reach of kids’ hands in school and public libraries".

Their graphic novels cover fantasy, slice-of-life stories which are intended for all ages. These have won multiple awards, with The Tea Dragon Society in particular winning two Eisner Awards, a Harvey Award, and a Dwayne McDuffie Award for Kids' Comics. The Tea Dragon Society also led to a card game and plushies, and another Tea Dragon book was published in 2019. When not working on a book, O'Neill is a fulltime freelance illustrator.

O'Neil's work often includes LGBT+ characters and positive messages; they consider inclusiveness to be important, and that media "should reflect the diversity of the world around us." To this end they portray different identities in their stories. The Tea Dragon Society was included in the American Library Association's Rainbow Book List for 2018. Princess Princess Ever After was also on the Rainbow Book List in 2017, making its top ten, and was awarded Autostraddle's Favourite Graphic Novel/Book in 2014. Autostraddle writer Mey said that Princess Princess Ever After "has characters of different races and body types. It has two princesses who are their own heroes and don’t need to change who they are to save themselves and the day. It has a really cute queer couple. And all of this is in an all-ages comic." O'Neill has said that "with consciousness of a new generation I would like to try to make books that inspire kindness, self-acceptance and social responsibility."

In a Twitter post of 18 December 2020, O'Neill said that they prefer to be known as Kay and that they use they/them pronouns.

Awards

|-
| 2019
| Aquicorn Cove
| Eisner Award: Best Publication for Kids (ages 9–12)
| 
| 
|-
| 2018
| The Tea Dragon Society
| Eisner Award: Best Publication for Kids (ages 9–12)
| 
| 
|-
| 2018
| The Tea Dragon Society
| Eisner Award: Best Webcomic
| 
| 
|-
| 2018
| The Tea Dragon Society
| Dwayne McDuffie Award for Kids' Comics
| 
| 
|-
| 2018
| The Tea Dragon Society
| Harvey Award: Best Children or Young Adult Book
| 
| Co-winner with The Prince and the Dressmaker
|-
| 2014
| Princess Princess Ever After
| Cybils Award
| 
| 
|-
| 2014
| Princess Princess Ever After
| Autostraddle: Favorite Graphic Novel/Book
| 
|

Works 

Counting Stars (2012), webcomic
Song of the Wheel (2012), webcomic
The Girl from Hell City (2013), webcomic
The Girl With Eyes Like a Cat (2013), webcomic
Don't Let Go (2013), webcomic
Below the Waves (2014), webcomic
 Mushrooms (2014), webcomic
Princess Princess Ever After (2016), published by Oni Press (first version published as a 2014 webcomic titled Princess Princess) 
The Tea Dragon Society (2017), published by Oni Press
Aquicorn Cove (2018), published by Oni Press
The Tea Dragon Festival (2019), published by Oni Press
 Dewdrop (2020), published by Oni Press
How to Date Your Dragon (2020) webcomic
The Tea Dragon Tapestry (2021)
The Moth Keeper (2023)

References 

New Zealand comics artists
Harvey Award winners
Living people
Year of birth missing (living people)
New Zealand LGBT writers
New Zealand illustrators
Eisner Award winners
Non-binary writers